Cynelos is a large extinct genus of bear dogs which inhabited North America, Europe, and Africa from the Early Miocene subepoch to the Late Miocene subepoch 20.4—13.7 Mya, existing for approximately .

Species
 C. caroniavorus White, 1942
 C. idoneus Matthew, 1924
 C. lemanensis Pomel, 1846
 C. malasi Hunt & Stepleton, 2015
 C. stenosHunt Jr. and Yatkola, 2020
 C. sinapius Matthew, 1902

References

Miocene mammals of North America
Miocene mammals of Europe
Miocene mammals of Africa
Miocene bear dogs
Prehistoric carnivoran genera